Winnie Holzman (born August 18, 1954) is an American dramatist, screenwriter, and poet. She is known for having created the ABC television series My So-Called Life, which led to a nomination for a scriptwriting Emmy Award in 1995, as well as her work writing for thirtysomething and Once and Again. Holzman has garnered fame for her work on Broadway, most notably for co-writing the smash stage musical Wicked.

Early life 
Holzman was born in Manhattan but grew up in Roslyn Heights, New York, on Long Island in a Jewish family. Although she was shy, she wanted to become an actor. At 13, she attended the Circle in the Square Theatre School in New York.

Career 
Holzman graduated with a degree in English and a concentration in Creative Writing at Princeton University. She won many poetry awards, including the Academy of American Poets Prize.

Holzman had been performing in sketch comedy for years, "determined to never make a dime," but on the recommendation of a college friend, she applied to attend the musical theater program at New York University. She eventually got her master's degree in Musical Theatre Writing on a full scholarship. Arthur Laurents was one of her mentors. Other teachers included Stephen Sondheim, Hal Prince, Betty Comden, Adolph Green, and Leonard Bernstein.

Theater 
Her stage writing credits include Serious Bizness. While at NYU she wrote the musical Birds of Paradise (with composer David Evans), which was produced off-Broadway in 1987 and directed by Laurents. It got scathing reviews.

Holzman made her Broadway debut in 2003 when she wrote the book for the Stephen Schwartz musical Wicked, based on the novel of the same name by Gregory Maguire. She won the Drama Desk Award for Outstanding Book of a Musical and was nominated for the Tony Award for Best Book of a Musical.

Television writing 
In 1988, Holzman's husband, actor-writer Paul Dooley, got a job in Los Angeles on the TV series Coming of Age. While visiting her brother, cinematographer Ernest Holzman, on the set of thirtysomething, writer Richard Kramer suggested she should write for the show. Ed Zwick and Marshall Herskovitz bought a spec script from Holzman, and she went on to become a staff writer on thirtysomething in 1989. She wrote nine episodes during its last two seasons. Zwick and Herskovitz later executive produced My So-Called Life, a show about a teenage girl. Holzman went from story editor to executive story editor to a creator and writer of the show.

Holzman has collaborated on various short films with her daughter, Savannah. They penned a TV pilot based on the Sasha Paley novel Huge, which ABC Family greenlit in January 2010 with a direct-to-series order. Huge premiered in late June 2010. The show team included Holzman, Dooley, her daughter, and her brother, who was the cinematographer. The series was cancelled on October 4, 2010 due to low ratings compared with the network's other summer hits.

From 2014 to 2016, Holzman was one of the producers and writers of the Showtime series Roadies, a behind-the-scenes comedy about people working with a touring rock band created by Cameron Crowe, J. J. Abrams (executive producing), and Holzman, that ran for a season. The series starred Luke Wilson, Imogen Poots, Keisha Castle-Hughes, Peter Cambor, Rafe Spall and Carla Gugino.

Acting 
Holzman has had a number of acting spots, primarily cameo roles on her own TV shows and a role as a therapist on Curb Your Enthusiasm. She also had a small role in the film Jerry Maguire. She wrote and performed several personal essays at the Un-Cabaret spoken word shows in Los Angeles and is featured on their CD Play the Word (Vol. 1).

Personal life 
Holzman has been married to character actor Paul Dooley, whom she met at an improv acting class in New York, since November 18, 1984. Holzman notes that their 26-year age difference is "... a big part of our lives, but in a way it's meaningless." They have a daughter Savannah Dooley and live in Toluca Lake in Los Angeles, California.

Filmography

Writing credits 
The Wonder Years (1990) (TV) (one episode only)
Thirtysomething (1990–1991) (TV)
My So-Called Life (1994–1995) (TV) (Creator)
'Til There Was You (1997)
Once and Again (1999–2002) (TV)
Wicked (2003) (Stage)
Huge (2010) (TV) (Co-creator)
Roadies (2016) (TV)
Wicked: Part One (2024)
Wicked: Part Two (2025)

Acting credits 
Thirtysomething as Sherry Eisen (1990) (TV)
Major Dad as Mrs. Burns (1992) (TV)
My So-Called Life as Cathy Kryzanowski (1994) (TV)
Jerry Maguire as Women's Group Member (1996)
Love, American Style as Miss Hepker (1999) (TV)
Once and Again as Shelley (2000–2002) (TV)
Roswell as Madame Vivian (2000–2002) (TV)
Hopeless Pictures as Actress (2005) (TV)
Curb Your Enthusiasm as Dr. Salvin (2007) (TV)
Checkmate as Mrs. Sappington (2009) (short film)
The Comeback as Script Supervisor (2014) (TV)
You People as Mrs. Greenbaum (2023)

References

External links 

Internet Broadway Database

1954 births
20th-century American dramatists and playwrights
American television actresses
Television producers from California
American women television producers
American television writers
American women poets
Circle in the Square Theatre School alumni
Drama Desk Award winners
Living people
Tisch School of the Arts alumni
Princeton University alumni
American women dramatists and playwrights
American women screenwriters
Jewish American screenwriters
Jewish American dramatists and playwrights
Jewish American poets
American women television writers
Writers from New York City
People from Roslyn Heights, New York
People from Toluca Lake, Los Angeles
20th-century American women writers
Screenwriters from New York (state)
Television producers from New York City
Screenwriters from California